The elongate carpet shark (Parascyllium elongatum) is a species of carpetshark in the family Parascylliidae. It was described by P.R. Last and J.D. Stevens in 2008.

References

External links
 

elongate carpet shark
Marine fish of Western Australia
elongate carpet shark